is a Japanese mobile phone visual novel created by ARiKO System about a group of five girls trying to become voice actresses. An anime adaptation entitled  aired in Japan on TV Tokyo between April 4 and September 27, 2006, containing twenty-five episodes.

Plot
Love Get Chu is a story involving five girls that come to a training school named Lambda Eight (Λ8) to be able to fulfill their common goal of becoming voice actresses. Eventually, they all manage to get into the school, though first they must go through with the training.

Characters

The main protagonist, she is a strange girl who carries around a small stuffed rabbit called Usamaru-san and speaks to it frequently, often while in public. She wanted to become a voice actress to meet Minato Ichinose, her favorite actor who she always wished would marry her but later in the episodes, she started to have feelings for Atari and gets jealous of Yurika.

She is an amateur voice actress, though it is unsure why she chose this profession. She seems to have a quiet, shy personality who doesn't speak out much.

She likes anime so much that she wanted to become a voice actress. She has a very hyperactive personality and is also very confident in herself. As a voice actress, she dreams to be special and noticed among people. Ultimately, she wants to rise as a famous actress that appears on the covers of magazines. She's jealous of Momoko for living with Atari.

A tomboy girl who prefers to be the voice for boys instead of girls.

She couldn't find good enough work as an actress, so tried her luck as being a voice actress. She seems to be a wealthy person who even has a maid named Kiyoka follow her around.

He is a young anime artist working who meets Momoko one day on a train, though later he starts living in the same group home as her. He started liking Momoko for her unique personality and eventually loved it.

The manager of the group home where Momoko and Atari (among several others) live while in Tokyo. She has a nice personality though often gets her tenants to do work for her.

Theme Song
Opening Song - Moonflower (Yuri Kasahara)
Ending Song - Ai no Uta (Shoko Haida)

Episodes

External links
 Anime official website 
 

Mobile games
Romantic comedy anime and manga
Anime series